Aris B.C. competed in Greek Basket League. They started their Greek League season campaign, after finishing in fourth place in the previous season's playoffs.

Competitions

League

Matches

2011–12 in Greek basketball by club
Aris B.C. seasons